Frisco may refer to:

Places in the United States
Frisco, Alabama, an unincorporated community
San Francisco, California, as a nickname
Frisco, Colorado, a home rule municipality
Frisco Historic Park – see Frisco Schoolhouse
Frisco, Idaho, a ghost town
Frisco, Illinois, an unincorporated community
Frisco, Louisiana, an unincorporated community
Frisco, Missouri, an unincorporated community
Frisco Lake, Missouri
Frisco, North Carolina, an unincorporated community
Frisco, Pennsylvania, an unincorporated community
Frisco, Texas, a city
Frisco, Utah, a ghost town
Frisco Peak, Utah
Frisco Mountain, Washington

Railroad-related
Frisco Bridge, a rail bridge between West Memphis, Arkansas and Memphis, Tennessee
Frisco Depot, a railroad depot in Fayetteville, Arkansas
St. Louis–San Francisco Railway (1876–1980), also known as "the Frisco"
Frisco Station, a railway station in Idabel, Oklahoma, on the National Register of Historic Places

People
Frisco (rapper), English Grime MC Deshane Cornwall (born 1982)
Joe Frisco, American vaudeville performer Louis Wilson Joseph (1889–1958)
Rocky Frisco (1937–2015), stage name of Don Roscoe Joseph III, pianist with the JJ Cale Band

Other uses
Frisco (drink), a flavoured malt drink sold in Lithuania, Slovakia and the Czech Republic
Frisco Building, St. Louis, Missouri, on the National Register of Historic Places
Frisco High School, Frisco, Texas
Andrew "Frisco" Jones, a character on the soap opera General Hospital
Frisco League, a high school athletic conference in Missouri
Hardee's Frisco 250, the name of the ToyotaCare 250 NASCAR Xfinity Series race in 1994
The Frisco Kid a 1979 American western comedy film

See also
Frisco City, Alabama, a town
Frisco Station, Texas, a mixed-use development in Frisco, Texas